Louetsi-Wano is a department of Ngounié Province in south-western Gabon. The capital lies at Lébamba. It had a population of 9,750 in 2013. The average altitude is 116 m (381 ft).

Towns and villages 
 As of right now, Louetsi-Wano only contains one village, Lébamba. The closest nearby city is Ndendé.

References

Ngounié Province
Departments of Gabon